SolarMobil Manipal is the official Solar Car student team of Manipal University, Manipal, India. The team, founded in 2011 by a group of engineering students of Manipal Institute of Technology, is the third Indian solar car team and the first Indian team to build a passenger solar car. SolarMobil is a student project aimed at research & development of solar powered electric vehicle.

Since its founding, the SolarMobil Manipal team has built 4 cars, Freyr-1 - a single seater solar race car, SERVe (Solar Electric Road Vehicle), which is India's first institutional solar electric vehicle prototype and SM-S1 - India's first four-seater solar passenger vehicle. The 4th car, SM-S2 is a Cruiser Class solar race car aimed at participating in the World Solar Challenge, and was launched on 14 November 2018.

Team Logo

The team primarily consists of undergraduate students from various disciplines of engineering at Manipal Institute of Technology. They receive support by the faculty of Manipal Institute of Technology.
SolarMobil Manipal was formed with a vision of becoming a centre for research & development on solar vehicles.
While being the third Indian solar car team, SolarMobil has competed and stood out in various contests and has earned recognition on a national level, along with training engineers towards green innovation in the automobile sector.
The team is working towards developing practical solar passenger vehicle prototypes. Other than the university, the project is also supported by some of the major industries such as Tata Power Solar, Element14, LPS Bossard, Delfingen and Elithion along with other technology partners.
The team has three separate departments - Mechanical, Electrical & Management working on various aspects of the project.

Projects

The team has developed four projects till date Freyr-1, SERVe, SM-S1 and SM-S2. They are currently improving on their fourth project aimed at competing in the World Solar Challenge in Australia.

Freyr-1

Freyr-1 was SolarMobil's first car. The car marked the inception of the student collective project -SolarMobil in 2011. The designing, manufacturing and assembly of the car was carried out in-house by the SolarMobil team. Freyr-1 is a single seater, three wheeler solar racing car. 
The most notable features of this car were its lightweight space frame chassis, the custom-made suspension system and its ability to drive directly on solar power using a high-power-efficiency drive train. 

The most notable features of this car were clean and free fuel with zero emissions and zero noise pollution. It is built with AISI 4130 Chromoly steel chassis which gives it high strength to weight ratio and Fibre Reinforced Plastic body making it lightweight. The solar panels with a 6m2 area constitute the top of the car. The car adheres to World Solar Challenge specifications and belongs to the ‘Adventure Class’ category of solar vehicles.

Technical Specifications of Freyr-1

SERVe

SERVe (Solar Electric Road Vehicle) was designed in 2015, making it India's first passenger solar electric vehicle prototype.
It is a two-seat, four wheel solar electric passenger car. The top is covered by a curved solar panel which powers the battery pack; which in turn runs the motor. The solar car is capable of a top speed of 65 km/h and has a range of about 250 km.
The key features of the car is that SERVe is, like Freyr-1, it also uses clean and free fuel with zero emissions and zero noise pollution. It is built with AISI 4130 Chromoly steel chassis which gives it high strength to weight ratio and GFRP body making it lightweight. It has an aerodynamic and aesthetic design obtained from the cut section of a tear drop - the most aerodynamic shape. Solar panels are used with a 6m2 area for increased energy generation at 20% efficiency. Focus is laid on improved driver ergonomics.
With SERVe, SolarMobil entered and excelled in various competitions, most notably, being the winner of QuEST Global's annual pan-India innovation contest – QuEST Ingenium 2015.
Among the shortlisted 10 teams, SolarMobil from Manipal Institute of Technology was adjudged as the winning team. Besides an enticing cash prize, SolarMobil team members have been sponsored by Airbus to fly to Europe on a facility tour of its Stade & Bremen facility in Germany.
SERVe also secured the 3rd Place Prize at CII India Innovation Challenge amongst 1500 entries in 2014.

Technical specifications of SERVe

SM-S1 
SolarMobil Series -1 dubbed as SM-S1 is the third car out of the team. SM-S1 is India's first solar passenger vehicle. It seats four in a 2x2 arrangement and has a single charge range of 160km. The car uses a hybrid chassis consisting of a ladder and spaceframe chassis. The material used for the chassis is AISI 1018 steel. The body is made of glass fibre reinforced composite and the aerodynamic coefficient of the car is around 0.3. the size of the solar array is 4.5m2. The solar panels were provided to the team by Tata Solar. It houses a 19 kwh battery pack that was manufactured in-house using Li-ion cells.

The car houses a completely custom single speed gearbox that is linked to two AC motors via drive shafts. The car is a front wheel drive. The suspension systems, and hand brake systems were developed in-house and manufactured by the students themselves. The main braking system is hydraulic and uses Wilwood four piston callipers to provide efficient braking.

Achievements

References

https://web.archive.org/web/20150715190632/http://gearjunction.in/news/interview-with-solar-car-inventors-mit-students/
https://web.archive.org/web/20141218200328/http://www.solarracing.org/teams/asia/solarmobil-manipal/
http://www.team-bhp.com/forum/technical-stuff/152901-engineering-students-build-indias-1st-solar-powered-vehicle.html
http://www.solarwindhydroenergy.com/2014/08/solarmobil-solar-car-by-manipal.html
https://web.archive.org/web/20150402165808/http://www.solarchallenge.co.za/index.php/teams/146-solarmobil-manipal
https://web.archive.org/web/20150924022529/http://www.globalsolartechnology.com/solar/index.php?option=com_content&view=article&id=14611:solarmobil-manipal-to-participate-in-sasol-solar-challenge-2014-in-south-africa&catid=8:india-news&Itemid=29
http://www.newindianexpress.com/cities/bengaluru/Team-of-Engineering-Students-Unveils-Solar-powered-Car/2015/04/23/article2778443.ece
http://articles.economictimes.indiatimes.com/2015-04-22/auto/61417566_1_tata-power-solar-solar-panels-solar-car
http://www.thehindubusinessline.com/industry-and-economy/education/manipal-univ-team-builds-solarpowered-car/article7130243.ece
http://timesofindia.indiatimes.com/city/bengaluru/Engineering-students-shine-on-road-build-solar-powered-car/articleshow/47021417.cms
http://www.tata.com/company/releasesinside/Tata-Power-Solar-and-Manipal-University-unveil-SERVe-a-solar-car-prototype-aimed-at-commercial-usage
http://www.bbc.com/autos/story/20150515-where-is-my-solar-car
http://timesofindia.indiatimes.com/city/mysuru/MIT-students-get-a-glimpse-of-roads-that-they-less-travelled/articleshow/49335943.cms
http://timesofindia.indiatimes.com/city/bengaluru/Solar-car-by-Manipal-students-wins-top-award-accolades/articleshow/48989072.cms
http://www.indiancarsbikes.in/cars/serve-solar-car-by-manipal-students-119643/
http://www.deccanchronicle.com/150423/technology-latest/article/manipal-university-students-develop-solar-powered-car
http://archive.eetindia.co.in/www.eetindia.co.in/ART_8800711846_1800008_NT_2a368dcf.HTM
https://www.carandbike.com/news/indian-students-build-a-solar-car-for-international-competition-585472
http://www.electricautosport.com/2014/06/indian-students-build-energy-positive-two-seater-car/
http://www.gdnonline.com/Details/6369/This-student-built-solar-car-is-different
https://www.youtube.com/user/solarmobilmit
http://www.solarmobilmanipal.in/

Manipal Academy of Higher Education
Solar-powered vehicles
2011 establishments in Karnataka